Ryan Johnson may refer to:

Sports
Ryan Johnson (footballer, born 1984), Jamaican international footballer
Ryan Johnson (footballer, born 1996), English-born Northern Irish footballer
Ryan Johnson (ice hockey, born 1976), retired Canadian professional ice hockey centre
Ryan Johnson (ice hockey, born 2001), American professional ice hockey defenseman
Ryan Johnson (skier) (born 1974), Canadian freestyle skier

Other
Ryan Johnson (actor) (born 1979), Australian actor
Ryan Johnson (artist) (born 1978), American artist
Ryan Johnson (marine scientist) (born 1977), marine biologist
Ryan R. Johnson, producer

See also
Rian Johnson (born 1973), American film director
Ryan Johnston (disambiguation)